Ziaul Hasan Siddiqui is the chairman of Sonali Bank Limited. He is a former Deputy Governor of Bangladesh Bank.

Early life and education 
Siddiqui completed his Bachelors and Masters in Economics from the University of Dhaka in 1973 and 1974 respectively.

Siddiqui completed his second Masters on Public Administration from Harvard University in 1989.

Career 
Siddiqui taught at BRAC University in the school of business.

In 2010, as Deputy Governor of Bangladesh Siddiqui sought to bring back money laundered by Arafat Rahman Koko, son of Prime Minister Khaleda Zia.

Siddiqui was the Deputy Governor of Bangladesh Bank from 2006 to 2011. He joined Prime Bank as an advisor after leaving Bangladesh Bank in 2012. He was a Director of AB Bank.

On 21 August 2019, Siddiqui was appointed Chairman of Sonali Bank for a three year term by the Financial Institutions Division of the Ministry of Finance. In 2020, he committed to work with Bangladesh Financial Intelligence Unit.

Siddiqui launched Blaze services of Sonali Bank in partnership with IT Consultants Limited on 25 August 2021 with Sajeeb Wazed Joy, son of Prime Minister Sheikh Hasina, as chief guest. Special guests at the event were Zunaid Ahmed Palak, State Minister of ICT, and Ahmed Jamal, Deputy Governor of Bangladesh Bank. He is a Director of PBL Exchange (UK) Limited.

References 

Living people
University of Dhaka alumni
Bangladeshi bankers
Harvard University alumni
Academic staff of BRAC University
Year of birth missing (living people)